Amália Pinto (born 12 June 1996) is an Angolan handball player for Primeiro de Agosto and the Angolan national team.

She represented Angola at the 2019 World Women's Handball Championship.

References

1996 births
Living people
Angolan female handball players